Danielys Del Valle García Buitrago (born August 20, 1986 in Valera, Trujillo) is a female track and road cyclist from Venezuela. She won a bronze medal for her native country at the 2007 Pan American Games in Rio de Janeiro, Brazil. She competed in the road race at the 2008 Olympics, placing 54th, and again in the road race at the 2012 Olympics, in which she did not finish.

Career

2006
1st  in Venezuelan National Championships, Road, Elite, Individual Time Trial, San Carols, Cojedes (VEN)
 in Central American and Caribbean Games, Road, Individual Time Trial, Cartagena (COL)
2007
1st  in Venezuelan National Championships, Road, Elite, Venezuela (VEN)
 in Pan American Championships, Track, Pursuit, Valencia (VEN)
  in Pan American Games, Road Race, Rio de Janeiro (BRA)
2008
1st  in Venezuelan National Championships, Road, Elite, Individual Time Trial, Mérida (VEN)
1st  in Venezuelan National Championships, Road, Elite, Santa Cruz de Mora (VEN)
2nd in Copa Federacion Venezolana de Ciclismo (VEN)
2009
1st  in Venezuelan National Championships, Road, Elite, Individual Time Trial, Quibor (VEN)
2nd Venezuelan National Championships, Track, Points Race
2nd Venezuelan National Championships, Track, Individual Pursuit
2010
 in Central American and Caribbean Games, Road, Individual Time Trial, Mayagüez (PUR)
 in Central American and Caribbean Games, Track, Individual Pursuit, Mayagüez (PUR)
 in Central American and Caribbean Games, Track, Points Race, Mayagüez (PUR)
 in Pan American Championships, Track, Points race, Aguascalientes (MEX)
1st  in Venezuelan National Championships, Road, Elite, Individual Time Trial, Trujillo (VEN)
1st  in Venezuelan National Championships, Road, Elite, Road Race, Trujillo (VEN)
2011
1st  in Venezuelan National Championships, Road, Elite, Individual Time Trial, Anzoátegui (VEN)
2nd in Venezuelan National Championships, Track, Scratch Race
2nd in Venezuelan National Championships, Track, Points Race
3rd in Venezuelan National Championships, Track, Individual Pursuit
2nd in Clásico Aniversario Federacion Ciclista de Venezuela, Araure (VEN)
2nd in Clasico Corre Por La Vida, Guanare (VEN)
2012
1st  in Venezuelan National Championships, Road, Elite, Individual Time Trial, Falcón (VEN)
2nd in Venezuelan National Championships, Road, Elite, Road Race, Falcón (VEN)
 in Pan American Championships, Track, Points Race, Mar del Plata (ARG)
3rd in Clasicó Fundadeporte, Valencia (VEN)
2013
1st  in Venezuelan National Championships, Road, Elite, Individual Time Trial, Santa Cruz de Mora (VEN)
1st  in Venezuelan National Championships, Road, Elite, Road Race, Santa Cruz de Mora (VEN)
2nd in Venezuelan National Championships, Track, Points Race
1st in Copa Cobernador de Carabobo, Track, Points Race
2nd in Copa Cobernador de Carabobo, Track, Scratch
Copa Cuba de Pista
2nd Points Race
2nd Team Pursuit (with Zuralmy Rivas, Yennifer Cesar and Fanny Alvarez)
 in Pan American Championships, Track, Points Race, Mexico City (MEX)
 in Pan American Championships, Track, Team Pursuit, Mexico City (MEX)(with Yennifer Cesar and Angie González)
2016
Copa Venezuela
1st Scratch Race
2nd Points Race

References

External links
 
 

1986 births
Living people
Venezuelan female cyclists
Cyclists at the 2007 Pan American Games
Cyclists at the 2008 Summer Olympics
Cyclists at the 2011 Pan American Games
Olympic cyclists of Venezuela
People from Valera
Pan American Games silver medalists for Venezuela
Pan American Games bronze medalists for Venezuela
Cyclists at the 2012 Summer Olympics
Pan American Games medalists in cycling
Central American and Caribbean Games gold medalists for Venezuela
Central American and Caribbean Games bronze medalists for Venezuela
Competitors at the 2006 Central American and Caribbean Games
Competitors at the 2010 Central American and Caribbean Games
Central American and Caribbean Games medalists in cycling
Medalists at the 2007 Pan American Games
20th-century Venezuelan women
21st-century Venezuelan women